John Cameron Robbie (born 17 November 1955) is a former  international rugby union player who played scrum half, and a well known radio presenter in South Africa on Talk radio 702. His previous rugby career has also seen him take up the role of rugby commentator, both on television and at Independent Newspapers. He is a Laureus Sport for Good Foundation Ambassador.

Life and career
John Robbie went to The High School, Dublin, where he was a member of the Leinster Schools Cup winning side in 1973.  He then attended Trinity College and Christ's College, Cambridge, and was captain of the rugby teams at both universities.

He received his first cap for Ireland against Australia in Lansdowne Road on 17 January 1976, and went on to receive 9 caps for Ireland. He toured South Africa in 1980 with the British and Irish Lions playing in one test match, and at the time played club rugby for Greystones RFC; see 1980 British Lions tour to South Africa. He moved to South Africa in 1981. He was later picked twice for the South African rugby team but never received a cap, at the time he was playing for Transvaal.

As a talkshow host, he has "interviewed a range of important figureheads, from heads of government and key players in the political arena, to sporting heroes, business gurus..." and is "not afraid to ask the difficult questions. He's hard-hitting, while remaining fair and honest." He became known for his motto "Cut the Slush!", pushing the other party to get to the point.

After a career in talk radio spanning 30 years, he has announced his retirement from radio with his farewell segment being his usual morning slot on 15 December 2016.

References

1955 births
Living people
South African people of British descent
Irish emigrants to South Africa
Irish rugby union players
Ireland international rugby union players
South African rugby union players
British & Irish Lions rugby union players from Ireland
Dublin University Football Club players
Greystones RFC players
Alumni of Christ's College, Cambridge
South African radio presenters
Rugby union journalists
People educated at The High School, Dublin
Rugby union players from Dublin (city)
Rugby union scrum-halves